The Hupp-Yeats was an electric car. It was built in Detroit, Michigan, from 1911 to 1916.  The parent company was begun by Robert Craig Hupp, previously of the Hupp Motor Company as the R.C.H. Corporation through 1912, later becoming the Hupp-Yeats Electric Car Company.

Description
The Hupp-Yeats used Westinghouse motors with five selective speeds.  The cars were built as four-seaters in both open and closed models, and came with standard solid rubber tires.

Legacy
Only a few of these cars are still known to exist completely. Most of these are in museums.

References

External links
 Photo of the Hupp-Yeats at the Reynolds-Alberta Museum in Wetaskiwin, Alberta, Canada; originally bought by James Kieth Wilson of Victoria, British Columbia, for his daughter Victoria Wilson

Defunct motor vehicle manufacturers of the United States
Motor vehicle manufacturers based in Michigan
Electric vehicles introduced in the 20th century
Defunct companies based in Michigan
Hupmobile